The 2015–16 season was Aston Villa's 24th season in the Premier League and 28th and final consecutive season in the top flight of English football, as well as their 141st season as a professional football club. Villa also participated in the FA Cup and League Cup. 

The club was initially managed by Tim Sherwood, in what would have been his first full season as manager. However, Sherwood was sacked on 25 October 2015. A week later, Remi Garde agreed a three-and-a-half year deal to become manager of the bottom of table Premier League side. Six days later, in Garde's first match in charge, his new team drew 0–0 with league leaders Manchester City.

Garde put a strong emphasis on discipline at Villa. He dropped midfielder Jack Grealish from the first team after he went partying following a 4–0 loss at Everton. On 29 March 2016, with Villa still bottom of the league, Garde left the club by mutual consent. Ex-Coventry City manager Eric Black was put in temporary charge. The club were relegated from the top flight of English football for the first time since the 1986–87 season following an away loss to Manchester United on 16 April 2016, having been one of remaining sides who had not been relegated since the Premier League's inception in 1992 at the beginning of the 2015/16 season (Arsenal, Chelsea, Everton, Liverpool, Man United, Tottenham).

Key events 

19 May: Scott Sinclair joins the club permanently, having been on loan during the previous season, after the club confirms its survival in the Premier League.
8 June: The club's record signing Darren Bent is released at the end of his contract, along with Enda Stevens and Graham Burke.
17 June: Micah Richards becomes Tim Sherwood's first official signing as manager, joining on a free transfer after the end of his contract at Manchester City.
18 June: Academy graduate Andreas Weimann joins Derby County after eight years at the club.
1 July: Former captain Ron Vlaar officially departs after rejecting a new contract offer from the club. Chris Herd is also officially released at the end of his contract.
9 July: Goalkeeper Mark Bunn joins the club on a free transfer, signing a two-year deal, after his contract expired at Norwich City.
10 July: Villa sign Senegalese defensive midfielder Idrissa Gueye from Lille for a fee believed to be £9 million. Shay Given leaves the club after four years, joining Stoke City on a free transfer after the final year of his contract was mutually terminated.
17 July: Club captain Fabian Delph performs a second u-turn in the space of a week, as he completes a move to Manchester City after they trigger his £8 million release clause. His departure from the club comes only six days after he allegedly turned down a move to City, in favour of staying at Villa.
18 July: Villa sign French left-back Jordan Amavi from Nice for an undisclosed fee, believed to be £9 million.
22 July: Christian Benteke completes a move to Liverpool after they trigger his £32.5 million release clause.
27 July: Ghanaian striker Jordan Ayew signs for Villa on a five-year deal from Lorient, for a fee in the region of £9 million.
28 July: Spanish fullback José Ángel Crespo signs for Villa from La Liga side Córdoba on a three-year deal for an undisclosed fee.
31 July: The club confirms its eighth and ninth signings of the summer as Jordan Veretout and Rudy Gestede both sign on five-year deals. The pair join from Nantes and Blackburn Rovers respectively. Nathan Baker signs a new four-year contract, the same day.
5 August: Ciaran Clark signs a new five-year contract at the club and Aly Cissokho joins Porto on a season-long loan. Cissokho is later recalled in December after injury rules out first choice left-back Jordan Amavi for the season.
7 August: Callum Robinson joins Bristol City on a season-long loan.
8 August: Villa win their first game of the season 1–0 away at newly promoted Bournemouth. Substitute Rudy Gestede scores the winner on his debut for the club.
12 August: Ashley Westwood signs a new five-year contract with the club.
13 August: Villa are drawn against Notts County in the second round of the League Cup.
14 August: Spanish winger Adama Traoré signs for Villa from La Liga side Barcelona on a five-year deal for an undisclosed fee.
20 August: Leandro Bacuna signs a new five-year contract at the club.
21 August: Gary Gardner commits to the club for another three years.
25 August: Villa make it through to the third round of the League Cup, after a 5–3 extra-time victory over Notts County. They draw arch-rivals Birmingham City in the next round.
1 September: On deadline day the club brings in three new players, as Joleon Lescott is signed from rivals West Bromwich Albion, Tiago Ilori joins on a season-long loan from Liverpool and 18-year-old Montenegrin goalkeeper Matija Sarkic, who will link up with the development squad, is recruited from Anderlecht. Nathan Baker leaves on a season-long loan to Bristol City and Joe Bennett joins Bournemouth on loan until January, after signing a new one-year extension to his contract earlier in the day.
13 September: Villa blow a 2–0 lead with 18 minutes to go, as they lose 3–2 away at Leicester City. One positive is academy product Jack Grealish scoring his first senior goal for the club.
22 September: Villa beat fierce rivals Birmingham City 1–0 in the first Second City Derby for almost five years.  A Rudy Gestede header is enough to send them through to the fourth round of the League Cup.
24 October: Villa sack Tim Sherwood as manager after a 2–1 loss against Swansea City at Villa Park. This was the club's eighth defeat in the first ten league games and sixth in a row.
29 October: Villa are knocked out of the League Cup by Southampton after a 2–1 defeat.
2 November: Villa appoint Frenchman Rémi Garde as their new manager on a three-and-a-half year deal.
8 November: Villa draw 0–0 with league leaders Manchester City, earning Rémi Garde a point in his first match in charge as manager and simultaneously ending a seven-match losing streak.
28 November: After a 3–2 defeat against Watford at Villa Park, Villa break their record for most league games without winning with the total reaching 13.
7 December: Villa draw Wycombe Wanderers away in the third round of the FA Cup.
28 December: Villa lose their final game of 2015 going down 2–0 away to Norwich City. This defeat sees the club 11 points from safety at the halfway point of the season, as well as their winless run in the league stretching to 18 games.
2 January 2016: Villa start 2016 with another defeat, this time losing 3–1 at their nearest rivals in the table Sunderland.
9 January: Another disappointing result for the club as they draw 1–1 in the third round of theFA Cup to League Two side Wycombe Wanderers, sparking angry scenes from Villa fans during and after the match.
12 January: Villa finally record their first league win since the opening day, overcoming Crystal Palace 1–0 at Villa Park courtesy of a Joleon Lescott goal following a goalkeeping error. The game saw the team end a club-record 19 game winless run, as well as recording their first home league win since May 2015.
19 January: Villa defeat Wycombe Wanderers 2–0 in their FA Cup third round replay, to set up a home tie against Manchester City in the next round.
30 January: Villa exit the FA Cup after a 0–4 loss to Manchester City at Villa Park.
16 April: Villa lose 1–0 to Manchester United, confirming relegation to the Championship.

Players

First Team Squad 

 HG1 = Association-trained player
 HG2 = Club-trained player
 U21 = Under 21 players (Contract and Scholars)
 EXC = Excluded from 25-man Premier League squad (players loaned out not counted)

Transfers

In 

Summer

Total incoming:  Undisclosed (~ £52,000,000)

Out 

Summer

Winter

Summer

Total outgoing:  Undisclosed (~ £44,250,000)

Loans

In 

Summer

Out 

Summer

Winter

Overall transfer activity 

Spending

Summer:  Undisclosed (~ £52,000,000)

Total:  Undisclosed (~ £52,000,000)

Income

Summer:  Undisclosed (~ £44,250,000)

Total:  Undisclosed  (~ £44,250,000)

Net expenditure

Summer:  Undisclosed (~ £7,750,000)

Total:  Undisclosed  (~ £7,750,000)

Pre-season friendlies

Competitions

Overall

Overview

Overview 
{| class="wikitable" style="text-align: center"
|-
!rowspan=2|Competition
!colspan=8|Record
|-
!
!
!
!
!
!
!
!
|-
| Premier League

|-
| FA Cup

|-
| League Cup

|-
! Total

Premier League

League table

Results summary

Results by matchday

Matches 

On 17 June 2015, the fixtures for the forthcoming season were announced.

FA Cup

League Cup

Statistics

Appearances 

Notes

Players without appearances before going out on season-long loans.

Goalscorers 

Correct as of 6 February 2016
Players with the same number of goals are listed by their position on the club's official website Source
  Players highlighted in light grey denote the player had scored for the club before leaving for another club
  Players highlighted in light cyan denote the player has scored for the club after arriving at Aston Villa during the season
  Players highlighted in Blonde denote the player had scored for the club before leaving the club on loan for part/the rest of the season

Assists 

Correct as of 6 February 2016
Players with the same number of goals are listed by their position on the club's official website Source
  Players highlighted in light grey denote the player had assisted for the club before leaving for another club
  Players highlighted in light cyan denote the player has assisted for the club after arriving at Aston Villa during the season
  Players highlighted in Blonde denote the player had assisted for the club before leaving the club on loan for part/the rest of the season

Disciplinary record 

Correct as of 15 May 2016 
Players are listed in descending order of 
Players with the same number of cards are listed by their position on the club's official website Source
  Players highlighted in light grey denote the player has received a yellow/red card for the club before leaving for another club
  Players highlighted in light cyan denote the player has received a yellow/red card for the club after arriving at Aston Villa during the season
  Players highlighted in Blonde denote the player had received a yellow/red card for the club before leaving the club on loan for part/the rest of the season

Notes

Suspensions

Clean sheets 

Includes all competitive matches.

References

Aston Villa
Aston Villa F.C. seasons